This is a list of airlines currently operating in the Solomon Islands.

See also
 List of airlines of Oceania

Solomon Islands
Airlines
Airlines
Solomon Islands